The Rocket Propulsion Establishment at Westcott, Buckinghamshire on the site of the former RAF Westcott has made a number of notable contributions in the field of rocket propulsion, including input on the rocket design for the Blue Streak missile and the propulsion systems on Chevaline. It was also known as the Guided Projectiles Establishment and PERME Westcott (Propellants, Explosives and Rocket Motor Establishment, Westcott).

For many years this establishment was regarded as so secret that it was not marked on Ordnance Survey maps, although it was present, from necessity, on maps for the use of pilots.

History
The establishment was set up in April 1946 under the Ministry of Supply. In the initial years a team of German scientists worked at the site, and examples of German weapons were on-site for study. These included the V-1 flying bomb; V-2; Feuerlilie F-55 subsonic missile; Messerschmitt Me 163B rocket-propelled interceptor; Rheintochter-1 anti-aircraft missile; Ruhrstahl X-4 air-to-air wire-controlled missile; Enzian E-1 3,150-lb missile; Henschel Hs 298 anti-aircraft missile; Hs 293 anti-shipping weapon; and Schmetterling and Wasserfall anti-aircraft missiles.

Until the mid 1990s, Westcott undertook the design and development of rocket motors, and was responsible for most of the rocket motors used in British guided missiles and research vehicles. The design of these complete missile systems was undertaken by the Royal Aircraft Establishment at its facilities in Farnborough and Bedford. In 1984 the Rocket Propulsion Establishment came under the control of the Royal Ordnance Factories, and in 1987 control passed to the private sector when British Aerospace took over Royal Ordnance.

Projects
Example British rocket and missile programmes with RPE involvement follow, many of which were eventually abandoned:

 Black Arrow – Waxwing third-stage motor
 Black Knight
 Jaguar – first-, second- and third-stage motors
 Skylark

 Sea Slug missile – for naval use

Present day
Much of the site is now Westcott Venture Park, a business park for light industry. Businesses include a division of Norwegian company Nammo, which continues design and manufacture of the LEROS rocket engines, developed by Royal Ordnance; Airborne Engineering Ltd whose capabilities include rocket system design and testing; and Reaction Engines Ltd who began construction on a rocket test facility to develop their SABRE rocket engine concept in 2017. In 2016, the UK Government announced plans to develop a National Propulsion Test Facility at the site.

In 2013, English Heritage designated the surviving test-stands and control rooms as Grade II* or Grade II listed buildings.

References

1946 establishments in England
Aylesbury Vale
Military research establishments of the United Kingdom
Research institutes in Buckinghamshire
Rocket engine manufacturers of the United Kingdom
Rocketry
Space programme of the United Kingdom
Grade II* listed buildings in Buckinghamshire
Grade II listed buildings in Buckinghamshire